Love Me is the Taiwanese Mandopop artist Danson Tang's first Mandarin solo studio album. It was released on 17 August 2007 by Avex Taiwan. The album was available for pre-order with a gift and a cover art that is different from the normal edition. Two more editions were released, each with a bonus DVD containing different material: Love Me (Back to School Edition) on 14 September 2007 and Love Me (Asia Tour Celebration Edition) on 28 December 2007.

The album's title track, "愛我" (Love Me,) is a mid-tempo rock number. "分開以後" (After The Breakup) is a mellow ballad, whereas the track "愛在一起" (When Together) is an upbeat duet with Kimi. It also includes the ending theme song for episodes 1 to 30 of the Taiwanese drama The X-Family, "最愛還是你" (Still Love You the Most), starring Danson, Jiro Wang, Aaron Yan and Calvin Chen.

The track "分開以後" (After The Breakup) was one of the Songs of the Year at the 2008 Metro Radio Mandarin Music Awards presented by the Hong Kong radio station Metro Info.

Track listing
 "最愛還是你" Zuì Ài Hái Shì Nǐ (Still Love You the Most) (The X-Family episodes 1 to 30 ending theme) - 3:52
 "愛我" Ài Wǒ (Love Me) - 4:20
 "愛在一起" Ài Zài Yī Qǐ (When Together) - 4:15
 "分開以後" Fēn Kāi Yǐ Hòu (After The Breakup) - 3:59
 "造飛機" Zào Fēi Jī (Airplane) - 3:48
 "繼續愛上你" Jì Xù Ài Shàng Nǐ (Loving You) - 3:52
 "只欠一句 我愛你" Zhǐ Qiàn Yī Jù Qǒ Ài Nǐ (Owe You And I Love You) - 3:40
 "吻到一公里之外" Wěn Dào Yī Gōng Lǐ Zhī Wài (Kiss For A Mile) - 4:16
 "回馬槍" Huí Mǎ Qiāng (The Gun) - 4:05
 "冬季戀曲" Dōng Jì Liàn Qū (Winter Sonata) - 3:57

Music videos
 "愛我" (Love Me) MV
 "分開以後" (After The Breakup) MV
 "造飛機" (Airplane) MV
 "回馬槍" (The Gun) MV

Releases
Four editions of the album were released by Avex Taiwan:
 17 August 2007  - Love Me (Limited Preorder Edition) (愛我 限量預購版) (CD+DVD) - includes gifts and DVD with a music video and behind-the-scene footage of two music videos:
 "愛我" (Love Me) MV
 "愛我" (Love Me) MV behind-the-scene footage
 "分開以後" (After The Breakup) MV behind-the-scene footage

 17 August 2007  - Love Me (愛我 初回版) (CD+DVD) - with different cover art to the pre-order edition and includes a DVD
 14 September 2007 - Love Me (Back to School Edition) (愛我 開學超值版) (CD+DVD) - includes DVD with two MVs and other behind-the-scene footage:
 Recording, photoshoot and promotion footage
 Dance practice footage
 "分開以後" (After The Breakup) MV
 "造飛機" (Airplane) MV

 28 December 2007 - Love Me (Asia Tour Celebration Edition) (愛我 亞洲之旅寫真慶功版) (CD+DVD) - includes DVD with a MV and Asian promotional tour footage:
 Hong Kong promotional tour
 China promotional tour
 Singapore and Malaysia promotional tour
 "回馬槍" (The Gun) MV

Notes

References

External links
  Danson Tang@Avex Taiwan official homepage
  Danson Tang discography@Avex Taiwan

2007 albums
Danson Tang albums
Avex Taiwan albums